The 2008 San Diego Padres season was the 40th season in franchise history. The Padres were attempting to win the NL West for the 3rd time in 4 years.

Offseason
December 14, 2007: David Freese was traded by the San Diego Padres to the St. Louis Cardinals for Jim Edmonds.

Regular season

Opening Day lineup

 On April 15, Brian Giles doubled in two runs off Rockies starter Ubaldo Jiménez for RBI numbers 999 and 1,000 for his career.  The Padres won 6–0.
 Against the Colorado Rockies on April 17, at Petco Park, the Padres played the longest game in team history, in terms of innings (22), losing 2–1.  The game was the second longest in team history, in terms of time, played in 6 hours, 16 minutes.

  On May 9, Jim Edmonds was given his unconditional release.  The 37-year-old Edmonds batted .178 (16-for-90) with two doubles, one home run, six RBI and six runs scored in 26 games this season with the Padres, appearing in center field in all 26 contests (24 starts).  To fill in the void by the release of Edmonds, Jody Gerut was recalled from AAA Portland.
 On May 10 vs. the Colorado Rockies at Petco Park, Greg Maddux became the ninth pitcher in Major League Baseball history to record his 350th win, the Padres winning 3–2.

Season standings

Record vs. opponents

Game log

|- align="center" bgcolor="#bbffbb"
| 1 || March 31 || Astros || 4–0 ||Peavy (1–0) || Oswalt (0–1) || ||44,965 ||1–0
|- align="center" bgcolor="#bbffbb"
| 2 || April 1 || Astros || 2–1 || Young (1–0) || Backe (0–1) || Hoffman (1) || 20,825 || 2–0
|- align="center" bgcolor="#ffbbbb"
| 3 || April 2 || Astros || 9–6 || Valverde (1–0) || Hoffman (0–1) || || 18,714 || 2–1
|- align="center" bgcolor="#bbffbb"
| 4 || April 3 || Astros || 3–2 || González (1–0) || Villarreal (0–1) || Hoffman (2) || 24,432 || 3–1
|- align="center" bgcolor="ffbbbb"
| 5 || April 4 || Dodgers || 7–1 || Kuroda (1–0) || Thatcher (0–1) || || 42,474 || 3–2
|- align="center" bgcolor="bbffbb"
| 6 || April 5 || Dodgers || 4–1 ||Peavy (2–0) || Penny (1–1) || || 38,819 || 4–2
|- align="center" bgcolor="ffbbbb"
| 7 || April 6 || Dodgers || 3–2 ||Broxton (1–0) || Hoffman (0–2) || Saito (1) || 44,165 || 4–3
|- align="center" bgcolor="bbffbb"
| 8 || April 7 || @ Giants || 8–4 || Maddux (1–0) || Cain (0–1) || || 42,861 || 5–3
|- align="center" bgcolor="ffbbbb"
| 9 || April 8 || @ Giants || 3 – 2 (11) || Hennessey (1–0) || Meredith (0–1) || || 35,795 || 5–4
|- align="center" bgcolor="ffbbbb"
| 10 || April 9 || @ Giants || 1–0 || Walker (1–0) || Bell (0–1) || || 30,310 || 5–5
|- align="center" bgcolor="bbffbb"
| 11 || April 11 || @ Dodgers || 7–5 || Peavy (3–0) || Penny (1–2) || Hoffman (3) || 54,052 || 6–5
|- align="center" bgcolor="ffbbbb"
| 12 || April 12 || @ Dodgers || 11–1 || Lowe (1–0) || Young (1–1) || || 54,955 || 6–6
|- align="center" bgcolor="bbffbb"
| 13 || April 13 || @ Dodgers || 1–0 || Maddux (2–0) || Billingsley (0–2) || Hoffman (4) || 47,357 || 7–6
|- align="center" bgcolor="bbffbb"
| 14 || April 15 || Rockies || 6–0 || Wolf (1–0) || Jiménez (1–2) || || 24,439 || 8–6
|- align="center" bgcolor="ffbbbb"
| 15 || April 16 || Rockies || 10–2 || Redman (2–1) || Germano (0–1) || || 21,730 || 8–7
|- align="center" bgcolor="ffbbbb"
| 16 || April 17 || Rockies || 2 – 1 (22) || Wells (1–0) || Rusch (0–1) || || 25,984 || 8–8
|- align="center" bgcolor="ffbbbb"
| 17 || April 18 || @ D-backs || 9–0 || Haren (3–0) || Maddux (2–1) || || 26,783 || 8–9
|- align="center" bgcolor="ffbbbb"
| 18 || April 19 || @ D-backs || 10–3 || Cruz (1–0) || Thatcher (0–2) || || 39,726 || 8–10
|- align="center" bgcolor="bbffbb"
| 19 || April 20 || @ D-backs || 9–4 || Wolf (2–0) || Johnson (0–1) || || 28,090 || 9–10
|- align="center" bgcolor="ffbbbb"
| 20 || April 21 || @ Astros || 10–3 || Oswalt (2–3) || Germano (0–2) || || 28,600 || 9–11
|- align="center" bgcolor="ffbbbb"
| 21 || April 22 || @ Astros || 11–7 || Valverde (3–1) || Bell (0–2) || || 33,434 || 9–12
|- align="center" bgcolor="ffbbbb"
| 22 || April 23 || Giants || 3–2 || Yabu (2–1) || Rusch (0–2) || Wilson (6) || 25,506 || 9–13
|- align="center" bgcolor="ffbbbb"
| 23 || April 24 || Giants || 1–0 || Lincecum (4–0) || Young (1–2) || Wilson (7) || 26,789 || 9–14
|- align="center" bgcolor="ffbbbb"
| 24 || April 25 || D-backs || 5–1 || Johnson (1–1) || Wolf (2–1) ||  || 31,340 || 9–15
|- align="center" bgcolor="bbffbb"
| 25 || April 26 || D-backs || 8–7 || Rusch (1–2) || Petit (0–1) || || 31,295 || 10–15
|- align="center" bgcolor="ffbbbb"
| 26 || April 27 || D-backs || 2–1 || Webb (6–0) || Peavy (3–1) || Lyon (7) || 40,074 || 10–16
|- align="center" bgcolor="ffbbbb"
| 27 || April 29 || @ Phillies || 7–4 || Hamels (3–3) || Maddux (2–2) || || 34,207 || 10–17
|- align="center" bgcolor="bbffbb"
| 28 || April 30 || @ Phillies || 4–2 || Young (2–2) || Moyer (1–2) || Hoffman (5) || 36,648 || 11–17
|-

|- align="center" bgcolor="ffbbbb"
| 29 || May 1 || @ Phillies || 3–2 || Gordon (3–2) || Thatcher (0–3) ||Lidge (7) || 33,001 || 11–18
|- align="center" bgcolor="ffbbbb"
| 30 || May 2 || @ Marlins || 6–4 || Hendrickson (5–1) || Germano (0–3) || Gregg (5) || 14,562 || 11–19
|- align="center" bgcolor="bbffbb"
| 31 || May 3 || @ Marlins || 7–2 || Peavy (4–1) || Nolasco (1–3) || || 37,689 || 12–19
|- align="center" bgcolor="ffbbbb"
| 32 || May 4 || @ Marlins || 10–3 || A. Miller (2–2) || Maddux (2–3) || || 11,422 || 12–20
|- align="center" bgcolor="ffbbbb"
| 33 || May 6 || @ Braves || 5–3 || Jurrjens (4–2) || Young (2–3) || Bennett (1) || 21,657 || 12–21
|- align="center" bgcolor="ffbbbb"
| 34 || May 7 || @ Braves || 5–2 || Hudson (5–2) || Wolf (2–2) || Acosta (2) || 25,194 || 12–22
|- align="center" bgcolor="ffbbbb"
| 35 || May 8 || @ Braves || 5–4 || Acosta (1–1) || Thatcher (0–4) || || 28,337 || 12–23
|- align="center" bgcolor="ffbbbb"
| 36 || May 9 || Rockies || 4–2 || Cook (6–1) || Peavy (4–2) || Fuentes (4) || 31,057 || 12–24
|- align="center" bgcolor="bbffbb"
| 37 || May 10 || Rockies || 3–2 || Maddux (3–3) || Jiménez (1–3) || Hoffman (6) || 34,117 || 13–24
|- align="center" bgcolor="bbffbb"
| 38 || May 11 || Rockies || 6–1 || Young (3–3) || Reynolds (0–1) || || 28,624 || 14–24
|- align="center" bgcolor="ffbbbb"
| 39 || May 12 || @ Cubs || 12–3 || Zambrano (6–1) || Wolf (2–3) || || 39,528 || 14–25
|- align="center" bgcolor="bbffbb"
| 40 || May 13 || @ Cubs || 4–3 || Estes (1–0) || Marquis (1–3) || Hoffman (7) || 40,028 || 15–25
|- align="center" bgcolor="ffbbbb"
| 41 || May 14 || @ Cubs || 8–5 || Lilly (4–4) || Peavy (4–3) || || 39,650 || 15–26
|- align="center" bgcolor="ffbbbb"
| 42 || May 15 || @ Cubs || 4–0 || Dempster (5–1) || Maddux (3–4) || Wood (8) || 40,629 || 15–27
|- align="center" bgcolor="bbffbb"
| 43 || May 16 || @ Mariners || 6–4 || Young (4–3) || Batista (3–5) || Hoffman (8) || 35,586 || 16–27
|- align="center" bgcolor="ffbbbb"
| 44 || May 17 || @ Mariners || 4–2 || Bédard (3–2) || Wolf (2–4) || Putz (4) || 32,290 || 16–28
|- align="center" bgcolor="ffbbbb"
| 45 || May 18 || @ Mariners || 3–2 || Rhodes (2–0) || Bell (0–3) || Putz (5) || 35,483 || 16–29
|- align="center" bgcolor="ffbbbb"
| 46 || May 19 || Cardinals || 8–2 || Wellemeyer (5–1) || Ledezma (0–1) || || 22,638 || 16–30
|- align="center" bgcolor="bbffbb"
| 47 || May 20 || Cardinals || 3–2 || Corey (1–0) || Piñeiro (2–3) || Hoffman (9) || 27,181 || 17–30
|- align="center" bgcolor="ffbbbb"
| 48 || May 21 || Cardinals || 11–3 || Looper (6–3) || Young (4–4) || || 21,011 || 17–31
|- align="center" bgcolor="bbffbb"
| 49 || May 22 || Reds || 8–2 || Wolf (3–4) || Harang (2–6) || || 22,047 || 18–31
|- align="center" bgcolor="ffbbbb"
| 50 || May 23 || Reds || 3–2 || Weathers (2–3) || Hoffman (0–3) || Cordero (10) || 26,422 || 18–32
|- align="center" bgcolor="ffbbbb"
| 51 || May 24 || Reds || 7–2 || Arroyo (3–4) || Ledezma (0–2) || || 27,499 || 18–33
|- align="center" bgcolor="bbffbb"
| 52 || May 25 || Reds || 12 – 9 (18) || Banks (1–0) || Volquez (7–2) || || 36,508 || 19–33
|- align="center" bgcolor="bbffbb"
| 53 || May 27 || Nationals || 4–2 || Bell (1–3)  || Manning (0–1) || Hoffman (10) ||18,744 || 20–33
|- align="center" bgcolor="ffbbbb"
| 54 || May 28 || Nationals || 6–4 || Pérez (2–4) || Estes (1–1) || Rauch (11) || 19,201 || 20–34
|- align="center" bgcolor="bbffbb"
| 55 || May 29 || Nationals || 5–2 || Bell (2–3) || Rivera (3–3)  || Hoffman (11) || 25,021 || 21–34
|- align="center" bgcolor="bbffbb"
| 56 || May 30 || @ Giants || 7 – 3 (13) || Baek (1–1) || Sadler (0–1) || || 37,178 || 22–34
|- align="center" bgcolor="bbffbb"
| 57 || May 31 || @ Giants || 5–1 || Banks (2–0) || Misch (0–2) || || 34,921 || 23–34
|-

|- align="center" bgcolor="ffbbbb"
| 58 || June 1 || @ Giants || 4–3 (10) || Hinshaw (1–0) || Hoffman (0–4) || || 33,867 || 23–35
|- align="center" bgcolor="ffbbbb"
| 59 || June 2 || Cubs || 7–6 || Zambrano (8–1) || Baek (1–2) || Wood (15) || 30,259 || 23–36
|- align="center" bgcolor="ffbbbb"
| 60 || June 3 || Cubs || 9–6 || Marquis  (3–3) || Corey (1–1) || Wood (16) || 24,477 || 23–37
|- align="center" bgcolor="bbffbb"
| 61 || June 4 || Cubs || 2–1 || Bell (3–3) || Lilly (5–5) || Hoffman (12) || 25,258 || 24–37
|- align="center" bgcolor="bbffbb"
| 62 || June 5 || Mets || 2–1 || Hoffman (1–4) || Schoeneweis (0–2)|| || 28,867 || 25–37
|- align="center" bgcolor="bbffbb"
| 63 || June 6 || Mets || 2–1 || Wolf (4–4) || Santana (7–4) || Hoffman (13) || 27,749 || 26–37
|- align="center" bgcolor="bbffbb"
| 64 || June 7 || Mets || 2 – 1 (10) || Adams (1–0) || Feliciano (0–2) || || 38,972 || 27–37
|- align="center" bgcolor="bbffbb"
| 65 || June 8 || Mets || 8–6 || Guevara (1–0) || Wagner (0–1) || Hoffman (14) || 31,992 || 28–37
|- align="center" bgcolor="ffbbbb"
| 66 || June 10 || Dodgers || 7–2  || Proctor (1–0)|| Hampson (0–1)|| ||26,860 || 28–38
|- align="center" bgcolor="bbffbb"
| 67 || June 11 || Dodgers || 4–1 || Wolf (5–4)|| Billingsley (4–7) || Hoffman (15) || 29,218 || 29–38
|- align="center" bgcolor="bbffbb"
| 68 || June 12 || Dodgers || 9–0 || Peavy (5–3) || Kuroda (3–6) || || 36,354 || 30–38
|- align="center" bgcolor="ffbbbb"
| 69 || June 13 || @ Indians || 9–5 || Betancourt (2–3) || Meredith (0–2) || Kobayashi (3) || 31,399 || 30–39
|- align="center" bgcolor="bbffbb"
| 70 || June 14 || @ Indians || 8 – 3 (10) || Bell (4–3) || Mujica (0–1) || || 37,484 || 31–39
|- align="center" bgcolor="ffbbbb"
| 71 || June 15 || @ Indians || 7–3 || Sabathia (5–8) || Maddux (3–5) || || 33,017 || 31–40
|- align="center" bgcolor="ffbbbb"
| 72 || June 17 || @ Yankees || 8–0 || Pettitte (7–5) || Wolf (5–5) || || 52,306 || 31–41
|- align="center" bgcolor="ffbbbb"
| 73 || June 18 || @ Yankees || 8–5 || Rasner (4–4) || Peavy (5–4) || Rivera (19) || 52,628 || 31–42
|- align="center" bgcolor="ffbbbb"
| 74 || June 19 || @ Yankees || 2–1 || Veras (2–0) || Banks (2–1) || Rivera (20) || 54,362 || 31–43
|- align="center" bgcolor="bbffbb"
| 75 || June 20 || Tigers || 6–2 || Bell (5–3) || Rodney (0–1) || || 40,683 || 32–43
|- align="center" bgcolor="ffbbbb"
| 76 || June 21 || Tigers || 7–5 || Robertson (6–6) || Baek (1–3) || Jones (13) || 34,749 || 32–44
|- align="center" bgcolor="ffbbbb"
| 77 || June 22 || Tigers || 5–3 || Verlander (4–9) || Wolf (5–6) || Jones (14) || 28,779 || 32–45
|- align="center" bgcolor="ffbbbb"
| 78 || June 24 || Twins || 3–1 || Reyes (2–0) || Hoffman (1–5) || Nathan (20) || 36,948 || 32–46
|- align="center" bgcolor="ffbbbb"
| 79 || June 25 || Twins || 9–3 || Perkins (4–2) || Maddux (3–6) || || 22,234 || 32–47
|- align="center" bgcolor="ffbbbb"
| 80 || June 26 || Twins || 4–3 || Baker (4–2) || Banks (2–2) || Nathan (21) || 28,789 || 32–48
|- align="center" bgcolor="ffbbbb"
| 81 || June 27 || Mariners || 5–2 || Washburn (3–7) || Wolf (5–7) || Morrow (3) || 28,640 || 32–49
|- align="center" bgcolor="ffbbbb"
| 82 || June 28 || Mariners || 4–2 || Silva (4–9) || Baek (1–4) || Morrow (4) || 36,396 || 32–50
|- align="center" bgcolor="ffbbbb"
| 83 || June 29 || Mariners || 9–2 || Bédard (5–4) || Peavy (5–5) || || 29,966 || 32–51
|- align="center" bgcolor="bbffbb"
| 84 || June 30 || @ Rockies || 15–8 || Bell (6–3) || Fuentes (1–4) || || 43,248 || 33–51
|-

|- align="center" bgcolor="ffbbbb"
| 85 || July 1 || @ Rockies || 4–0 || Cook (11–5) || Banks (2–3) || || 26,221 || 33–52
|- align="center" bgcolor="ffbbbb"
| 86 || July 2 || @ Rockies || 8–1 || Jiménez (3–8) || Wolf (5–8) || || 28,377 || 33–53
|- align="center" bgcolor="bbffbb"
| 87 || July 4 || @ D-backs || 5–1 || Baek (2–4) || Haren (8–5) || || 49,110 || 34–53
|- align="center" bgcolor="bbffbb"
| 88 || July 5 || @ D-backs || 4–2 || Peavy (6–5) || Davis (3–4) || Hoffman (16) || 40,976 || 35–53
|- align="center" bgcolor="ffbbbb"
| 89 || July 6 || @ D-backs || 3–2 || Johnson (5–7) || Banks (2–4) || Lyon (18) || 28,246 || 35–54
|- align="center" bgcolor="ffbbbb"
| 90 || July 7 || Marlins || 3–1 || Nolasco (10–4) || Maddux (3–7) || Gregg (16) || 23,840 || 35–55
|- align="center" bgcolor="bbffbb"
| 91 || July 8 || Marlins || 10–1 || Wolf (6–8) || Miller (5–8) || || 24,762 || 36–55
|- align="center" bgcolor="ffbbbb"
| 92 || July 9 || Marlins || 5–2 || Olsen (5–4) || Baek (2–5) || Gregg (17) || 31,186 || 36–56
|- align="center" bgcolor="bbffbb"
| 93 || July 11 || Braves || 4–0 || Peavy (7–5) || Reyes (3–8) || Hoffman (17) || 40,232 || 37–56
|- align="center" bgcolor="ffbbbb"
| 94 || July 12 || Braves || 4–1 || Morton (2–2) || Maddux (3–8) || González (3) || 42,438 || 37–57
|- align="center" bgcolor="ffbbbb"
| 95 || July 13 || Braves || 12–3 || Campillo (4–4) || Wolf (6–9) || || 31,347 || 37–58
|- align="center" bgcolor="ffbbbb"
| 96 || July 17 || @ Cardinals || 4–3 || Lohse (12–2) || Peavy (7–6) || Franklin (13) || 42,148 || 37–59
|- align="center" bgcolor="ffbbbb"
| 97 || July 18 || @ Cardinals || 11–7 || McCllelan (2–4) || Bell (6–4) || || 44,398 || 37–60
|- align="center" bgcolor="ffbbbb"
| 98 || July 19 || @ Cardinals || 6–5 || Wolf (6–10) || Wellemeyer (8–4) || Franklin (14) || 45,399 || 37–61
|- align="center" bgcolor="ffbbbb"
| 99 || July 20 || @ Cardinals || 9–5 || Thompson (2–2) || Corey (1–2) || || 44,214 || 37–62
|- align="center" bgcolor="bbffbb"
| 100 || July 21 || @ Reds || 6–4 || Hensley (1–0) || Cordero (4–3) || Hoffman (18) || 18,177 || 38–62
|- align="center" bgcolor="ffbbbb"
| 101 || July 22 || @ Reds || 4–3 (11) || Majewski (1–0) || Corey (1–3) || || 21,233 || 38–63
|- align="center" bgcolor="ffbbbb"
| 102 || July 23 || @ Reds || 9–5 || Arroyo (9–7) || Meredith (0–3) || Cordero (21) || 22,970 || 38–64
|- align="center" bgcolor="ffbbbb"
| 103 || July 24 || @ Pirates || 9–1 || Herrera (1–1) || Hensley (1–1) || || 17,916 || 38–65
|- align="center" bgcolor="bbffbb"
| 104 || July 25 || @ Pirates || 6–5 || Baek (3–5) || Duke (4–8) || Hoffman (19) || 35,727 || 39–65
|- align="center" bgcolor="bbffbb"
| 105 || July 26 || @ Pirates || 9–6 || Banks (3–4) || Van Benschoten (1–3) || Hoffman (20) || 27,794 || 40–65
|- align="center" bgcolor="bbffbb"
| 106 || July 27 || @ Pirates || 3–1 || Peavy (8–6) || Grabow (5–3) || Hoffman (21) || 21,721 || 41–65
|- align="center" bgcolor="bbffbb"
| 107 || July 28 || D-backs || 8–5 || Maddux (4–8) || Owings (6–9) || Hoffman (22) || 29,302 || 42–65
|- align="center" bgcolor="ffbbbb"
| 108 || July 29 || D-backs || 3–0 || Davis (4–5) || Hensley (1–2) || Lyon (22) || 29,131 || 42–66
|- align="center" bgcolor="ffbbbb"
| 109 || July 30 || D-backs || 7–3 || Haren (11–5) || Baek (3–6) || || 31,755 || 42–67
|-

|- align="center" bgcolor="ffbbbb"
| 110 || August 1 || Giants || 3–2 (10) || Romo (1–1) || Hoffman (1–6) || Wilson (29) || 33,926 || 42–68
|- align="center" bgcolor="ffbbbb"
| 111 || August 2 || Giants || 2–0 || Zito (6–13) || Peavy (8–7) || Wilson (30) || 41,688 || 42–69
|- align="center" bgcolor="bbffbb"
| 112 || August 3 || Giants || 4–1 || Maddux (5–8) || Correia (2–6) || Hoffman (23) || 33,060 || 43–69
|- align="center" bgcolor="ffbbbb"
| 113 || August 5 || @ Mets || 6–5 || Pelfrey (10–7) || Adams (1–1) || Schoeneweis (1) || 52,130 || 43–70
|- align="center" bgcolor="bbffbb"
| 114 || August 6 || @ Mets || 4–2 || Baek  (4–6) || Martínez (3–3) || Hoffman (24) || 48,018 || 44–70
|- align="center" bgcolor="ffbbbb"
| 115 || August 7 || @ Mets || 5–3 || Heilman (2–6) || Bell (6–5)|| || 49,352 || 44–71
|- align="center" bgcolor="ffbbbb"
| 116 || August 8 || @ Rockies || 6–3 || Rusch (5–3) || Peavy (8–8) || Fuentes (21) || 33,147 || 44–72
|- align="center" bgcolor="bbffbb"
| 117 || August 9 || @ Rockies || 8–3 || Maddux (6–8) || Cook (14–8) || Hoffman (25) || 41,640 || 45–72
|- align="center" bgcolor="bbffbb"
| 118 || August 10 || @ Rockies || 16–7 || Hampson (1–1) || Hernández (0–1) || || 45,660 || 46–72
|- align="center" bgcolor="ffbbbb"
| 119 || August 12 || Brewers || 5–2 || Suppan (8–7) || Baek (4–7) || Torres (23) || 28,373 || 46–73
|- align="center" bgcolor="ffbbbb"
| 120 || August 13 || Brewers || 7–1 || Sabathia (7–0) || Banks (3–5) || || 32,771 || 46–74
|- align="center" bgcolor="bbffbb"
| 121 || August 14 || Brewers || 3–2 || Peavy (9–8) || Sheets (11–6) || Hoffman (26) || 30,145 || 47–74
|- align="center" bgcolor="ffbbbb"
| 122 || August 15 || Phillies || 1–0 || Moyer (11–7) || Maddux (6–9) || Lidge (29) || 37,558 || 47–75
|- align="center" bgcolor="bbffbb"
| 123 || August 16 || Phillies || 8–3 || Reineke (1–0) || Kendrick (10–7) || || 33,956 || 48–75
|- align="center" bgcolor="ffbbbb"
| 124 || August 17 || Phillies || 2–1 || Hamels (10–8) || Baek (4–8) || Lidge (30) || 34,756 || 48–76
|- align="center" bgcolor="ffbbbb"
| 125 || August 19 || @ D-backs || 7–6 || Davis (5–7) || Banks (3–6) || Peña (2) || 24,739 || 48–77
|- align="center" bgcolor="ffbbbb"
| 126 || August 20 || @ D-backs || 8–6 || Haren (14–6) || Peavy (9–9) || Rauch (18) || 26,518 || 48–78
|- align="center" bgcolor="ffbbbb"
| 127 || August 21 || @ D-backs || 4–1 || Webb (19–4) || Reineke (1–1) || || 25,611 || 48–79
|- align="center" bgcolor="ffbbbb"
| 128 || August 22 || @ Giants || 5–0 || Lincecum (14–3) || Baek (4–9) || || 33,615 || 48–80
|- align="center" bgcolor="ffbbbb"
| 129 || August 23 || @ Giants || 4–3 || Zito (8–15) || Adams (1–2) || Wilson (34) || 37,081 || 48–81
|- align="center" bgcolor="ffbbbb"
| 130 || August 24 || @ Giants || 7–4 || Correia (3–7) || Adams (1–3) || Wilson (35) || 37,174 || 48–82
|- align="center" bgcolor="bbffbb"
| 131 || August 25 || D-backs || 4–2 || Hoffman (2–6) || Rauch (4–5) || || 29,197 || 49–82
|- align="center" bgcolor="bbffbb"
| 132 || August 26 || D-backs || 9–2 || Reineke (2–1) || Webb (19–5) || || 32,104 || 50–82
|- align="center" bgcolor="bbffbb"
| 133 || August 27 || D-backs || 5–4 || Adams (2–3) || Qualls (2–8) || Hoffman (27) || 24,563 || 51–82
|- align="center" bgcolor="ffbbbb"
| 134 || August 29 || Rockies || 9–4 || Cook (16–8) || Hayhurst (0–1) || || 25,274 || 51–83
|- align="center" bgcolor="bbffbb"
| 135 || August 30 || Rockies || 9–4 || Geer (1–0) || Jiménez (9–12) || || 30,240 || 52–83
|- align="center" bgcolor="bbffbb"
| 136 || August 31 || Rockies || 2–1 || Hoffman (3–6) || Buchholz (6–4) || || 26,395 || 53–83
|-

|- align="center" bgcolor="ffbbbb"
| 137 || September 1 || @ Dodgers || 5–2 || Maddux (7–11) || Young (4–5) || Broxton (11) || 44,087 || 53–84
|- align="center" bgcolor="ffbbbb"
| 138 || September 2 || @ Dodgers || 8–4 || Kershaw (3–5) || Baek (4–10) || || 39,330 || 53–85
|- align="center" bgcolor="ffbbbb"
| 139 || September 3 || @ Dodgers || 6–4 || Kuroda (8–10) || LeBlanc (0–1) || Broxton (12) || 48,822 || 53–86
|- align="center" bgcolor="bbffbb"
| 140 || September 4 || @ Brewers || 5–2 || Estes (2–1) || Suppan (10–8) || Hoffman (28) || 33,182 || 54–86
|- align="center" bgcolor="ffbbbb"
| 141 || September 5 || @ Brewers || 3–2 (11) || Shouse (5–1) || Falkenborg (2–3) || || 41,515 || 54–87
|- align="center" bgcolor="ffbbbb"
| 142 || September 6 || @ Brewers || 1–0 || Sheets (13–7) || Peavy (9–10) || || 42,667 || 54–88
|- align="center" bgcolor="bbffbb"
| 143 || September 7 || @ Brewers || 10–1 || Young (5–5) || Parra (10–7) || || 44,568 || 55–88
|- align="center" bgcolor="bbffbb"
| 144 || September 8 || Dodgers || 4–0 || Baek (5–10) || Maddux (7–12) || || 25,942 || 56–88
|- align="center" bgcolor="ffbbbb"
| 145 || September 9 || Dodgers || 6–2 || Beimel (5–1) || Bell (6–6) || || 26,614 || 56–89
|- align="center" bgcolor="ffbbbb"
| 146 || September 10 || Dodgers || 7–2 || Lowe (13–11) || Estes (2–2) || || 27,208 || 56–90
|- align="center" bgcolor="bbffbb"
| 147 || September 11 || Giants || 11–3 || Geer (2–0) || Cain (8–12) || || 30,497 || 57–90
|- align="center" bgcolor="ffbbbb"
| 148 || September 12 || Giants || 5–2 || Sánchez (9–10) || Peavy (9–11) || Wilson (38) || 24,610 || 57–91
|- align="center" bgcolor="ffbbbb"
| 149 || September 13 || Giants || 7–0 || Lincecum (17–3) || Young (5–6) || || 31,015 || 57–92
|- align="center" bgcolor="ffbbbb"
| 150 || September 14 || Giants || 8–6 (10) || Romo (2–1) || Hayhurst (0–2) || Wilson (39) || 25,476 || 57–92
|- align="center" bgcolor="bbffbb"
| 151 || September 15 || @ Rockies || 11–5 || LeBlanc (1–1) || Reynolds (2–7) || || 25,296 || 58–93
|- align="center" bgcolor="ffbbbb"
| 152 || September 16 || @ Rockies || 10–3 || Jiménez (11–12) || Estes (2–3) || || 25,507 || 58–94
|- align="center" bgcolor="ffbbbb"
| 153 || September 17 || @ Rockies || 1–0 || Hernández (12–11) || Geer (2–1) || Fuentes (28) || 25,155 || 58–95
|- align="center" bgcolor="bbffbb"
| 154 || September 19 || @ Nationals || 11–6 (14) || Hampson (2–1) || Speigner (0–1) || || 28,600 || 59–95
|- align="center" bgcolor="bbffbb"
| 155 || September 20 || @ Nationals || 6–1 || Young (6–6) || Lannan (9–14) || || 27,474 || 60–95
|- align="center" bgcolor="bbffbb"
| 156 || September 21 || @ Nationals || 6–2 || Baek (6–10) || Pérez (7–11) || || 29,608 || 61–95
|- align="center" bgcolor="ffbbbb"
| 157 || September 22 || Dodgers || 10–1 || Billingsley (16–10) || LeBlanc (1–2) || || 48,905 || 61–96
|- align="center" bgcolor="ffbbbb"
| 158 || September 23 || Dodgers || 12–4 || Kershaw (5–5) || Ekstrom (0–1) || || 44,776 || 61–97
|- align="center" bgcolor="bbffbb"
| 159 || September 24 || Dodgers || 7–5 || Peavy (10–11) || Stults (2–3) || Hoffman (29) || 52,569 || 62–97
|- align="center" bgcolor="ffbbbb"
| 160 || September 26 || Pirates || 6–3 || Snell (7–12) || Ekstrom (0–2) || Capps (21) || 27,227 || 62–98
|- align="center" bgcolor="bbffbb"
| 161 || September 27 || Pirates || 3–2 || Young (7–6) || Barthmaier (0–2) || Hoffman (30) || 29,825 || 63–98
|- align="center" bgcolor="ffbbbb"
| 162 || September 28 || Pirates || 6–1 || Yates (6–3) || LeBlanc (1–3) || || 29,191 || 63–99
|-

Roster

Player stats

Batting

Starters by position
Note: Pos = Position; G = Games played; AB = At bats; H = Hits; Avg. = Batting average; HR = Home runs; RBI = Runs batted in

Other batters
Note: G = Games played; AB = At bats; H = Hits; Avg. = Batting average; HR = Home runs; RBI = Runs batted in

Pitching

Starting pitchers
Note: G = Games pitched; IP = Innings pitched; W = Wins; L = Losses; ERA = Earned run average; SO = Strikeouts

Other pitchers
Note: G = Games pitched; IP = Innings pitched; W = Wins; L = Losses; ERA = Earned run average; SO = Strikeouts

Relief pitchers
Note: G = Games pitched; W = Wins; L = Losses; SV = Saves; ERA = Earned run average; SO = Strikeouts

Farm system

References

2008 San Diego Padres season at Baseball Reference

San Diego Padres seasons
San Diego Padres
San Diego